Cane Creek Township is one of ten townships in Butler County, Missouri, USA.  As of the 2010 census, its population was 468.

Geography
It contains two cemeteries: Margaret Trainor and Shiloh.

The streams of Dry Branch and Ligett Creek run through this township.

References

External links
 US-Counties.com
 City-Data.com

Townships in Butler County, Missouri
Townships in Missouri